Starduster may refer to:

 Starduster (aircraft), a B-17G heavy bomber from World War II on display in Riverside, California
 Starduster (G.I. Joe), a fictional character of the G.I. Joe Team
 Stolp Starduster, an American single-seat homebuilt biplane
 Stolp Starduster Too, an American two-seat homebuilt biplane

See also
 
 Stardust (disambiguation)